Fusheng railway station is a railway station in Jiangbei District, Chongqing, China. It opened on 20 January 2017.

Metro connections
The station is served by Chongqing Rail Transit Line 4, and will be served by Line 15 in the future.

References

Railway stations in Chongqing
Railway stations in China opened in 2017